Lydia Kose is a Papua New Guinean footballer who plays as a defender for POM FC and the Papua New Guinea women's national team.

Notes

References

Living people
Women's association football defenders
Papua New Guinean women's footballers
Papua New Guinea women's international footballers
Year of birth missing (living people)